The sixth season of MasterChef Canada aired its special 2-hour season premiere on April 8, 2019 on CTV, concluding on June 10, 2019 with Jennifer Crawford of Kingston, Nova Scotia crowned as the winner and Andre Bhagwandat of Scarborough, Ontario finishing as the runner-up. Crawford became the first non-binary person and the first person from the Maritimes to win the competition. In a new twist this season, each judge selected six home cooks to invite to the Top 18, with each member receiving personal invitations delivered via courier.

Runner-up Andre Bhagwandat, who finished second place returned to MasterChef Canada: Back to Win. He placed 7th.

Top 12
Except where noted, source for all names, hometowns, and occupations:

Elimination table

 (WINNER) This cook won the competition.
 (RUNNER-UP) This cook finished in second place.
 (WIN) The cook won the individual challenge (Mystery Box Challenge or Elimination Test).
 (WIN) The cook was on the winning team in the Team Challenge and was directly advanced to the next round.
 (HIGH) The cook was one of the top entries in the Mystery Box Challenge, but did not win, or received considerable praise during an Elimination Test.
 (PT) The cook was on the losing team in the Team Challenge or did not win the individual challenge, but won the Pressure Test.
 (IN) The cook was not selected as a top entry or bottom entry in an individual challenge.
 (IN) The cook was not selected as a top entry or bottom entry in a team challenge.
 (IMM) The cook did not have to compete in that round of the competition and was safe from elimination.
 (IMM) The cook was selected by Mystery Box Challenge winner and did not have to compete in the Elimination Test. 
 (PT) The cook was on the losing team in the Team Challenge, competed in the Pressure Test, and advanced.
 (NPT) The cook was on the losing team in the Team Challenge, but was exempted from the Pressure Test
 (RET) The cook was eliminated but came back to compete to return to the competition.
 (LOW) The cook was one of the bottom entries in an individual elimination challenge or pressure test and advanced.
 (LOW) The cook was one of the bottom entries in the Team Challenge, and advanced.
 (WDR) The cook withdrew from the competition due to illness or personal reasons.
 (ELIM) The cook was eliminated from MasterChef.

Episodes

References

MasterChef Canada
2019 Canadian television seasons